The Embassy of Denmark in Moscow is the chief diplomatic mission of Denmark in the Russian Federation. It is located at 9 Prechistensky Lane in the Khamovniki District of Moscow.

See also 
 Denmark–Russia relations
 Diplomatic missions in Russia

References

External links 
  Embassy of Denmark in Moscow

Denmark–Russia relations
Denmark
Moscow
Khamovniki District
Cultural heritage monuments of regional significance in Moscow